Gift is the first joint album released by mother-and-daughter English folk music duo Eliza Carthy and Norma Waterson. It was the winner of the Best Album category of the 2011 BBC Radio 2 Folk Awards, where its opening track "Poor Wayfaring Stranger" also won Best Traditional Track.

Reception 
The album received positive reviews. In a five-starred review for The Guardian, Robin Denselow described it as "both bravely straightforward and powerfully emotional" and "impressive, even by their standards".

Writing for Bright Young Folk, Liz Osman said that Gift "is a simple non-showy album, and feels like a labour of love between mother and daughter. That warmth of purpose comes through in the delivery of every track, as well as the sleeve notes and album artwork. The calibre of each song, the arrangements and performance make Gift a wonderful collaborative album from two of the country’s best singers".

Track listing

Personnel 
 Eliza Carthy – vocals (tracks 1, 2, 4–11), fiddle (tracks 2, 4–7, 9), bells (track 4), octave violin (track 4), organetta (tracks 4, 9), mandolin (track 5), piano (tracks 6, 9), viola (track 7)
 Norma Waterson – vocals (tracks 1–3, 5–9, 11), triangle (track 5)
 Anne Waterson – vocals
 Marry Waterson – vocals
 Mike Waterson – vocals
 Aidan Curran – guitar, mandolin
 Danny Thompson – double bass
 Martin Simpson – banjo
 Martin Carthy – guitar, vocals
 Chris Parkinson – melodeon
 Oliver Knight – cello, electric guitar, vocals
 Saul Rose – melodeon
 Roger Williams – trombone

References 

2011 albums